Khardaha Assembly constituency is an assembly constituency in North 24 Parganas district in the Indian state of West Bengal.

Overview
As per orders of the Delimitation Commission, No. 109 Khardaha Assembly constituency is composed of the following: Khardaha municipality, Ward Nos.15, 18 to 21 and 35 of Panihati municipality, and Bandipur, Bilkanda I, Bilkanda II and Patulia gram panchayats of Barrackpore II community development block.

Khardaha Assembly constituency is part of No. 16 Dum Dum (Lok Sabha constituency).

Members of Legislative Assembly

Election results

2021 Bye election

2021

2016

2011
In the 2011 elections, Amit Kumar Mitra of Trinamool Congress defeated his nearest rival Asim Dasgupta of CPI(M).

 

Trinamool Congress did not contest this seat in 2006

1977–2006
In the 2006, 2001, 1996, 1991 and 1987 state assembly elections, Asim Dasgupta of CPI(M), won the Khardaha seat defeating his nearest rivals Mahadeb Basak of BJP in 2006, Ranjit Kumar Mukherjee of Trinamool Congress in 2001, Chinmoy Chatterjee of Congress in 1996, Sipta Bishnu of Congress in 1991 and Sudhir Banerjee of Congress in 1987. Kamal Sarkar of CPI(M) had won this seat in 1982 and 1977 defeating Nirmal Ghosh of Congress in 1982 and Harshadhari Bhattacharya of Congress in 1977.

1957–1972
Satkari Mitra of PSP won in 1957. Gopal Banerjee of CPI won in 1962. Sadhan Kumar Chakraborty of CPI(M) won in 1967, 1969 and 1971. Sisir Kumar Ghosh of CPI won in 1972.

1952
The Khardaha constituency did not exist in 1952.

References

Assembly constituencies of West Bengal
Politics of North 24 Parganas district